The bugle is a simple signaling brass instrument with a wide conical bore. It normally has no valves or other pitch-altering devices, and is thus limited to its natural harmonic notes, and pitch is controlled entirely by varying the embouchure.

History

See also Clarion and Natural trumpet

The English word, bugle, comes from a combination of words. From French, it reaches back to cor buglèr and bugleret, indicating a signaling horn made from a small cow's horn. Going back further, it touches on Latin, buculus, meaning bullock. Old English also influences the modern word with bugle, meaning "wild ox."

The name indicates an animal's (cow's) horn, which was the way horns were made in Europe after the fall of the Western Roman Empire. The modern bugle is made from metal tubing, and that technology has roots which date back to the Roman Empire, as well as to the Middle East during the Crusades, where Europeans re-discovered metal-tubed trumpets and brought them home.

Historically, horns were curved trumpets, conical, often made from ox or other animal horns, from shells, from hollowed ivory such as the (olifant). There existed another tradition of trumpets made of straight metal tubes of brass or silver that went back in Europe as far as the Greeks (salpinx) and Romans (Roman tuba), and further back to the Etruscans, Assyrians and Egyptians (King Tut's Trumpet). After the fall of Rome, when much of Europe was separated from the remaining Eastern Roman Empire, the straight, tubular sheet-metal trumpet disappeared and curved horns were Europe's trumpet.

The sheet-metal tubular trumpet persisted in the Middle East and Central Asia as the nafir and karnay, and during the Reconquista and Crusades, Europeans began to build them again, having seen these instruments in their wars. The first made were the añafil in Spain and buisine in France and elsewhere. Then Europeans took a step that hadn't been part of trumpet making since the Roman (buccina and cornu); they figured out how to bend tubes without ruining them and by the 1400s were experimenting with new instruments.

Whole lines of brass instruments were created, including initially examples like the clarion and the natural trumpet. These were bent-tube variations that shrunk the long tubes into a manageable size and controlled the way the instruments sounded. One of the variations was to create "sickle shaped" horn or "hunting horns" in the 15th century. By the 18th century, Germans had created a "half moon" shaped horn called the halbmondbläser, used by Jäger battalions. During the last quarter of the 18th century, or by 1800, the half-moon horn was bent further into a loop, possibly first by William Shaw (or his workshop) of London. The instrument was used militarily at that point as the "bugle horn."

In 1758, the Halbmondbläser (half-moon) was used by light infantry from Hanover, and continued until after 1813. It was crescent-shaped (hence its name) and comfortably carried by a shoulder strap attached at the mouthpiece and bell. It first spread to England where as the "bugle horn" it was gradually accepted by the light dragoons (1764), the Grenadier Guards (1772), light artillery (1788) and light infantry. 

18th-century cavalry did not normally use a standard bugle, but rather an early trumpet that might be mistaken for a bugle today, as it lacked keys or valves, but had a more gradual taper and a smaller bell, producing a sound more easily audible at close range but with less carrying power over distance. The earliest bugles were shaped in a coil – typically a double coil, but also a single or triple coil – similar to the modern horn, and were used to communicate during hunts and as announcing instruments for coaches (somewhat akin to today's automobile horn). Predecessors and relatives of the bugle included the post horn, the Pless horn (sometimes called the "Prince Pless horn"), the bugle horn, and the shofar, among others.  The ancient Roman army used the buccina.

Uses

Pitch control is done by varying the player's embouchure. Consequently, the bugle is limited to notes within the harmonic series. Scores for standard bugle calls use the five notes of the "bugle scale".

The bugle is used mainly in the military, where the bugle call is used to indicate the daily routines of camp. Historically the bugle was used in the cavalry to relay instructions from officers to soldiers during battle. They were used to assemble the leaders and to give marching orders to the camps.

The bugle is also used in Boy Scout troops and in the Boys' Brigade.

The Rifles, an infantry regiment in the British Army, has retained the bugle for ceremonial and symbolic purposes, as did other rifle regiments before it. The buglers in each battalion are headed by the bugle major, a senior non-commissioned officer holding the rank of sergeant or above.

The bugle has also been used as a sign of peace in the case of a surrender.

In most military units, the bugle can be fitted with a small banner or tabard (occasionally gold fringed) with the arms of its reporting service branch or unit.

In military tradition, the Last Post or Taps is the bugle call that signifies the end of the day's activities. It is also sounded at military funerals to indicate that the soldier has gone to his final rest and at commemorative services such as Anzac Day and Remembrance Day In Australia and New Zealand.

Variations

Keyed bugles were invented in the early 19th century. In England, a patent for one design was taken out by Joseph Halliday in 1811 and became known as the Kent bugle. This bugle established itself in military band music in Britain and America, and its popularity is indicated by the existence of many published method books and arrangements. It was in wide use until about 1850 by which time it had been largely replaced by the cornet. Richard Willis, appointed the first bandmaster of the United States Military Academy's West Point Band in 1817, wrote and performed many works for the keyed bugle.

Since the mid 19th century, bugles have been made with piston valves.

Pitches of bugles

Soprano bugle (high pitch)
Alto bugle (medium pitch)
Baritone bugle (tenor pitch)
Contrabass bugle (bass pitch)

References

Notes

Bibliography

See also
 Clarion (instrument)
 Fanfare trumpet
 Marching brass

External links

Evolution of the Bugle
Bugle in C by Thomas Key and William Trayls, London, 1811 at The Metropolitan Museum of Art

Brass instruments
Natural horns and trumpets